Telematic art is a descriptive of art projects using computer-mediated telecommunications networks as their medium. Telematic art challenges the traditional relationship between active viewing subjects and passive art objects by creating interactive, behavioural contexts for remote aesthetic encounters. Telematics was first coined by Simon Nora and Alain Minc in The Computerization of Society. Roy Ascott sees the telematic art form as the transformation of the viewer into an active participator of creating the artwork which remains in process throughout its duration. Ascott has been at the forefront of the theory and practice of telematic art since 1978 when he went online for the first time, organizing different collaborative online projects.

Pioneering experiments 
Although Ascott was the first person to name this phenomenon, the first use of telecommunications as an artistic medium has occurred in 1922 when the Hungarian constructivist artist László Moholy-Nagy made the work Telephone Pictures .  This work questioned the idea of the isolated individual artist and the unique art object. In 1932, Bertold Brecht emphasized the idea of telecommunications as an artistic medium in his essay 'The Radio as an Apparatus of Communication'. In this essay, Brecht advocated the two-way communication for radio to give the public the power of representation and to pull it away from the control of corporate media. Art historian Edward A. Shanken has authored several historical accounts of telematic art, including "From Cybernetics to Telematics: The Art, Pedagogy, and Theory of Roy Ascott."

In 1977, 'Satellite Arts Project' by Kit Galloway and Sherrie Rabinowitz used satellites to connect artists on the east and west coast of the United States. This was the first time that artists were connected in a telematic way. With the support of NASA, the artists produced composite images of participants, enabling an interactive dance concert amongst geographically disparate performers. An estimated audience of 25,000 saw bi-coastal discussions on the impact of new technologies on art, and improvised, interactive dance and music performances that were mixed in real time and shown on a split screen. These first satellite works emphasized the primacy of process that remained central to the theory and practice of telematic art.

Ascott used telematics for the first time in 1978 when he organized a computer-conferencing project between the United States and the United Kingdom called Terminal Art. For this project, he used Jacques Vallée's Infomedia Notepad System, which made it possible for the users to retrieve and add information stored in the computer’s memory. This made it possible to interact with a group of people to make "aesthetic encounters more participatory, culturally diverse, and richly layered with meaning". Ascott did more similar projects like Ten Wings, which was part of Robert Adrian’s The World in 24 Hours in 1982. The most important telematic artwork of Ascott is La Plissure du Texte  from 1983. This project allowed Ascott and other artists to participate in collectively creating texts to an emerging story by using computer networking. This participation has been termed as 'distributed authorship'. But the most significant matter of this project is the interactivity of the artwork and the way it breaks the barriers of time and space. In the late 1980s, the interest in this kind of project using computer networking expanded, especially with the release of the World Wide Web in the early 1990s.

French side story 
Thanks to the Minitel, France had a public telematic infrastructure more than a decade before the emergence of the World Wide Web in 1994. This enabled a different style of telematic art than the point-to-point technologies to which other locations were limited in the 1970s and 1980s. As reported by Don Foresta, Karen O'Rourke, and Gilbertto Prado, several French artists made some collective art experiments using the Minitel, among them Jean-Claude Anglade, Jacques-Elie Chabert, Frédéric Develay, Jean-Marc Philippe,<ref>Jean-Marc Philippe: Action télématique hybridant des installations radio-astronomiques, 1987</ref> Fred Forest, Marc Denjean and Olivier Auber. These mostly-forgotten experiments (with notable exceptions like the still-active Poietic Generator) foreshadowed later web applications, especially the social networks such as Facebook and Twitter, even as they offered theoretical critiques of them.

Pop culture and mass media 
Telematic art is now being used more frequently by televised performers. Shows such as American Idol that are based highly form viewer polls incorporate telematic art. This type of consumer applications is now grouped under the term "transmedia".

 See also 
Planetary Collegium
Poietic Generator

References

Further reading
 Ascott, Roy(2003).Telematic Embrace: Visionary Theories of Art, Technology, and Consciousness. (Ed.) Edward A. Shanken. Berkeley, CA:University of California Press. 
Ascott, R. 2002. Technoetic Arts (Editor and Korean translation: YI, Won-Kon), (Media & Art Series no. 6, Institute of Media Art, Yonsei University). Yonsei: Yonsei University Press
 Ascott, R. 1998. Art & Telematics: toward the Construction of New Aesthetics. (Japanese trans. E. Fujihara).  A. Takada &  Y. Yamashita eds. Tokyo:  NTT Publishing Co.,Ltd.
 O'Rourke, K., ed. 1992. Art-Réseaux (with articles in English by Roy Ascott, Carlos Fadon Vicente, Mathias Fuchs, Eduardo Kac, Paulo Laurentiz, Artur Matuck, Frank Popper, and Stephen Wilson) Paris, Editions du CERAP.
Shanken Edward A. 2000, Tele-Agency: Telematics, Telerobotics, and the Art of Meaning.'' Art Journal, issue 2 2000.

External links
 Telematic Connections

Digital art